This is a list of museums in Austria.

By state
 List of museums in Burgenland
 List of museums in Carinthia (state)
 List of museums in Lower Austria
 List of museums in Salzburg (state)
 List of museums in Styria
 List of museums in Tyrol (state)
 List of museums in Upper Austria
 List of museums in Vienna
 List of museums in Vorarlberg

See also 
 List of museums by country
 List of natural history museums in Austria
 List of libraries in Austria
 List of archives in Austria

External links 

 International Council of Museums: Austria

 
Museums